The Red Mountain AVA is an American Viticultural Area that includes the land surrounding Red Mountain in Benton County, Washington.  It is part of the Yakima Valley AVA, which in turn is part of the larger Columbia Valley AVA.  Located between Benton City and the City of West Richland, the Red Mountain AVA is the smallest in the state at only  in area. The area has more than  under cultivation of primarily red varietals including Cabernet Sauvignon, Merlot, Sangiovese, Cabernet Franc and Syrah. The reputation of the wines produced in this area has brought Red Mountain AVA worldwide acclaim. The vineyards in this appellation have produced grapes for some of the most sought after wines in Washington State.

Geography 

The Missoula floods, a series of massive floods that occurred at the end of the last Ice Age, profoundly affected the soils of Red Mountain. The fast travelling flood waters, estimated at 390 meters tall, would sweep around the east and west edges of Red Mountain, creating powerfully back-eddies. As a result of the back-eddies, sediments were deposited in an irregular manner, creating a heterogeneous soil  with  a series of gravel lenses. In the 10,000 years since the Missoula floods, wind-blown loess was deposited, creating a thin mantle of dunes that vary in thickness throughout Red Mountain.  This has created a series of soils that differ from those of the immediately surrounding area.

The geography to the northeast features part of the Columbia Basin lowlands where the Columbia River turns southward towards the Saddle Mountains. The red color in the name comes from the dark red springtime hue of the drooping brome or "cheatgrass" in the area. The soil in the area is very gravelly, with high alkalinity (high pH) and calcium carbonate content.

Climate 
The area has one of the most unusual terroirs in the state with the southwest facing slopes documenting warmer temperatures and more sunlight hours than any other part of the Columbia Valley AVA. The nighttime temperatures drop considerably, helping to preserve the acid levels within the grape.  At Benton City, the Yakima River flows past the area and provides a moderating effect on the temperature. Cool air from the north, seeking the lower elevation of the river valley, moves downwards across the hillsides planted with vineyards and helps keep the grapes from being overheated. The constant air movement prevents air from settling in the area and allowing frost to damage the grapes

The area has a desert climate with average yearly rainfall of five inches. During the growing season, daytime temperatures average  with nighttime temperatures dropping below . Vineyards rely on irrigation to supply water to their plants, allowing growers to optimize the growth cycle of their grapevines.

History 
In the 1970s, John Williams of Kiona Vineyards and Jim Holmes, originally of Kiona then Ciel du Cheval vineyards, pioneered grape growing in the area. In the 1980s, wines made from grapes in the Red Mountain area began receiving recognition for their distinct flavor profiles though federal laws permitted wine labels only to carry the designation as being from the Columbia Valley AVA or Yakima Valley AVA. In the late 1990s, Lorne Jacobson from Hedges Family Estates started a drive to achieve federal recognition of the area as its own AVA, which was granted in April, 2001. Hedges Family Estates' appellation petition was joined by Kiona Vineyards, Blackwood Canyon Vintners, Sandhill Winery, Seth Ryan Winery and Terra Blanca Winery.

In 2007, Chateau Ste Michelle and Marchesi Antinori invested 6.5 million dollars in the appellation to purchase vineyards and establish a winery to produce their joint venture wine, Col Solare.

Wines 

The area is known for producing powerful, tannic red wines. The wines are known for their balance in flavors, with an intense concentration of berry flavors. Compared to the Cabernet Sauvignon produced in other areas of the state, the Cabernets here are more structured than fruit-driven. Grapes from this area are in high demand and vineyards with notable reputations can receive as much as 30% above market price for their crops. The primary Cabernet Sauvignon clone planted is clone #8, which in Red Mountain produces a Cabernet wine similar in profile to a California wine, while the same clone planted in nearby Horse Heaven Hills AVA produces a wine similar in profile to Bordeaux.

100 point wines 

Many of Washington's cult wines are produced from Cabernet Sauvignon grapes grown in this AVA including the 2002, 2003 and 2005 Quilceda Creek Vintners Cabernet Sauvignon, which scored the rare 100 point wine rating from Robert Parker's The Wine Advocate. At the time, only 15 other wines in the US had received this designation, all made from California grapes. Only five other previous vintages have received consecutive perfect scores in The Wine Advocate's publishing history. The Quilceda Creek wines were blends from three Red Mountain vineyards-Ciel du Cheval, Klipsun, and Tapteil-and one vineyard from the nearby Horse Heaven Hills AVA.

Future growth 
In the early 21st century, the reputation of Red Mountain AVA has helped foster an era of growth for the appellation. Like most wine growing regions in Eastern Washington, Red Mountain is in the rain shadow of the Cascade Range. Irrigation is essential to wine growing, with water rights being tightly controlled by Washington's Department of Ecology. In the past, this has limited commercial growth and the opening of new wineries in the area though these restrictions may be lightened in the future. In anticipation of future growth, a committee of local grape growers was formed to promote the development of the area's roads and infrastructure.

Vineyards 

Ciel du Cheval
Cooper Estate Vineyard
Klipsun
Kiona Vineyards
Obelisco Estate
Ranch at the End of the Road
Heart of the Hill
Avennia Estate Vineyard
Force Majeure Vineyards (Formerly "Grand Rêve")
Tinte Estate Vineyard
Terra Blanca Estate Vineyard
Scooteney Flats Vineyard
Red Heaven Vineyard
Artz Vineyard
Red Mountain Railroad Vineyard
Grand Ciel Vineyard, DeLille Cellars

On-Mountain Wineries 
 Col Solare Winery
 Cooper Wine Company
 Fidelitas
 Frichette Winery
 Hamilton Cellars
 Hedges Family Estate
 Hightower Cellars
 Kiona Vineyards and Winery
 Monte Scarlatto Estate Winery
 Avennia
 Terra Blanca

References

External links 
List of Wineries in Red Mountain
Red Mountain AVA Alliance

American Viticultural Areas
Geography of Benton County, Washington
Washington (state) wine
2001 establishments in Washington (state)